Dysthaeta anomala is a species of beetle in the family Cerambycidae. It was described by Pascoe in 1859. It is known from Australia.

References

Epicastini
Beetles described in 1859